The 1979 Corby District Council election took place on 3 May 1979 to elect members of Corby District Council in Northamptonshire, England. This was on the same day as other local elections. The Labour Party regained overall control of the council which it had lost to the Conservative Party at the previous election in 1976. The council has remained continuously under Labour control to this day.

Ward-by-Ward Results

Central Ward (3 seats)

Danesholme Ward (3 seats)

East Ward (2 seats)

Hazelwood Ward (3 seats)

Kingswood Ward (3 seats)

Lloyds Ward (3 seats)

Lodge Park Ward (3 seats)

Rural East Ward (1 seat)

Rural North Ward (1 seat)

Rural West Ward (1 seat)

Shire Lodge Ward (2 seats)

West Ward (2 seats)

References

1979 English local elections
1979
1970s in Northamptonshire